Thomas Francis Banchoff (born April 7, 1938) is an American mathematician
specializing in geometry.  He is a professor at Brown University, where he has taught since 1967. He is known for his research in differential geometry in three and four dimensions, for his efforts to develop methods of computer graphics in the early 1990s, and most recently for his pioneering work in methods of undergraduate education utilizing online resources.

Banchoff graduated from the University of Notre Dame in 1960, receiving his B.A. in Mathematics, and received his Masters and Ph.D. from UC Berkeley in 1962 and 1964, where he was a student of Shiing-Shen Chern.  Before going to Brown he taught at Harvard University and the University of Amsterdam. In 2012 he became a fellow of the American Mathematical Society. In addition, he was a president of the Mathematical Association of America.

Selected works
 with Stephen Lovett: Differential Geometry of Curves and Surfaces (2nd edition), A. K. Peters 2010
 with Terence Gaffney, Clint McCrory: Cusps of Gauss Mappings, Pitman 1982
 with John Wermer: Linear Algebra through Geometry, Springer Verlag 1983
 Beyond the third dimension: geometry, computer graphics, and higher dimensions, Scientific American Library, Freeman 1990
 Triple points and surgery of immersed surfaces. Proc. Amer. Math. Soc. 46 (1974), 407–413.
 Critical points and curvature for embedded polyhedra. Journal of Differential Geometry 1 (1967), 245–256. (Theorem of Gauß-Bonnet for Polyhedra)

Teaching Experience 

 Benjamin Peirce Instructor, Harvard, 1964 - 1966
 Research Associate, Universiteit van Amsterdam, 1966 - 1967;
 Brown University: 
 Asst Professor, 1967
 Associate Professor 1970
 Professor 1973 - 2014
 G. Leonard Baker Visiting Professor of Mathematics, Yale, 1998
 Visiting Professor, University of Notre Dame, 2001
 Visiting Professor, UCLA, 2002
 Visiting Professor, University of Georgia, 2006
 Visiting Professor, Stanford University,  2010
 Visiting Professor, Technical University of Berlin, 2012
 Visiting Professor, Sewanee: the University of the South, 2015
 Visiting Professor, Carnegie Mellon University, 2015
 Visiting Professor, Baylor University, 2016
 Paul Halmos Visiting Professor, Santa Clara University, 2018

Further reading
 Donald J. Albers & Gerald L. Alexanderson (2011) Fascinating Mathematical People: interviews and memoirs, "Tom Banchoff", pp 57–78, Princeton University Press, .
 Illustrating Beyond the Third Dimension by Thomas Banchoff & Davide P. Cervone

References

External links
 Personal web page
 biography as president of MAA

1938 births
Living people
20th-century American mathematicians
21st-century American mathematicians
Differential geometers
UC Berkeley College of Letters and Science alumni
Harvard University faculty
Brown University faculty
Fellows of the American Mathematical Society
Presidents of the Mathematical Association of America